Máire Eilís Ní Fhlaithearta is an Irish actress and former model.

Biography
Ní Fhlaithearta plays the character Caitríona on the Irish language drama, Ros na Rún, and has been a regular since its first broadcast. She has been in the acting profession since childhood. She is now married with two daughters, and runs a boutique, ÍOMHA, in An Spidéal.

See also
 Ó Flaithbertaigh

References

External links
 

Actresses from County Galway
Living people
Irish stage actresses
Irish television actresses
Irish female models
Year of birth missing (living people)
20th-century Irish people
21st-century Irish people